Leptosporomyces is a genus of resupinate (crust-like) fungi in the family Amylocorticiaceae. The genus is widespread in the Northern Hemisphere and contains 11 species.

Species
Leptosporomyces adnatus
Leptosporomyces fuscostratus
Leptosporomyces galzinii
Leptosporomyces globosus
Leptosporomyces juniperinus
Leptosporomyces luteofibrillosus
Leptosporomyces montanus
Leptosporomyces mundus
Leptosporomyces raunkiaeri
Leptosporomyces roseus
Leptosporomyces septentrionalis

References

External links

Amylocorticiales
Taxa named by Walter Jülich
Fungi described in 1972